Le philtre is an 1831 opera in two acts by Daniel Auber to a libretto by Eugène Scribe set in the Basque country. It premiered at the Théâtre de l’Académie royale de musique on 20 June 1831. In the 20th century it was largely eclipsed by the success of an Italian opera based on Scribe's libretto, which appeared in Italy in the next year, Donizetti’s L'elisir d'amore. But in the 19th century Auber's original was largely judged superior.

Cast
Guillaume ........, a simple peasant, in love with Térézine (became Nemorino in Donizetti's L'elisir d'amore)	tenor 
Térézine..........(Adina in L'elisir) 
Joli-Cœur ........(Belcore in L'elisir) 
Fontanarose.......(Dulcamara in L'elisir) 
Jeannette ........(Gianetta in L'elisir) 
Soldiers, peasants and young girls

Recording
 Patrick Kabongo tenor (Guillaume), Emmanuel Franco (Joli-Cœur), Eugenio Di Lieto (Fontanarose) Luiza Fatyol (Térézine), Adina Vilichi (Jeannette). Cracow Philharmonic Chorus Cracow Philharmonic Orchestra Luciano Acocella, Naxos 2CD 2022

References

Opéras comiques
Operas by Daniel Auber
Libretti by Eugène Scribe
French-language operas
Operas
1831 operas
Opera world premieres at the Opéra-Comique
Operas set in Italy